Viktor Pavlovich Nogin (14 February [O.S. 2 February] 1878 – 22 May 1924) was a Bolshevik revolutionary, Soviet politician and statesman in Moscow, holding many high positions in the party and in government, including Chairman of the Moscow Military-Revolutionary Committee and Chairman of the Presidium of the Executive Committee of Moscow Council of Workers' Deputies. He was a member of first Council of People's Commissars, i.e., the first Soviet Government, and People's Commissar for Commerce and Industry.

Biography
Viktor Nogin, born in Moscow, Russia, was the son of a clerk. He left school at 14, and worked in a textile factory in St Petersburg.
 In 1898 he joined the Russian Social Democratic Labour Party (RSDLP). He was arrested that same year and exiled to Poltava. In 1900, he emigrated. He returned to Russia, having agreed to act as a distributor of Iskra, the newspaper founded abroad by Vladimir Lenin and Julius Martov. When the RSDLP split into factions in 1903, Nogin joined the Bolsheviks. In 1907, he was a delegate to the RSDLP congress in London, where he was elected to the Central Committee. During his years as a revolutionary, operating illegally in Russia, he was arrested eight times, and escaped six times.

Within the Bolshevik faction, Nogin was a 'conciliator' who wanted to reunite the RSDLP. In January 1910, he was one of the organisers of a three week conference in Paris, called by the Central Committee. As part of the preparations, he travelled to Baku, hoping to enlist Joseph Stalin, then known as 'Koba' but failed to make contact with him. At the conference, Lenin was repeatedly outvoted, as the delegates decided in favour of reuniting the Bolsheviks and Mensheviks. According to Nadezhda Krupskaya, Lenin's widow, Nogin wanted to "unite everybody", including those who wanted to abandon illegal activity, but when he returned to Russia to try to put this into effect, he was rebuffed by the Bolsheviks there. He was arrested in April 1911, for the last time, and spent five years in prison.

By 1917 Nogin was one of the leaders of the Moscow branch of Bolsheviks. In April, he was chaired the party conference convened while Lenin was still absent abroad, and when a lone delegate raised the possibility of a second, Bolshevik revolution, Nogin ruled him out of order. The conference elected him to the Central Committee. 

After Lenin had returned and was calling for a second revolution, Nogin was one of the leading Bolsheviks who argued against him. At the Sixth Party Congress, in August, he warned: "Is it possible, comrades, that our country has made such a leap in two months that it is already prepared for socialism? Where are our allies? So far, we have only the platonic sympathy of the Western European proletariat ... We will find active support only in the “rotten” Soviets" Despite being in what soon became the minority, he was re-elected to the Central Committee in August, with the fifth highest vote (behind Lenin, Grigory Zinoviev, Lev Kamenev and Leon Trotsky. He was a member of the Provisional Committee during the struggle against General Lavr Kornilov's failed coup in Petrograd. He was a member of the Executive Committee of Moscow Soviet of People's Deputies. As Chairman of the Moscow Military-Revolutionary Committee, Nogin tried to lead a peaceful and bloodless transfer of power to the Bolsheviks, hoping to avoid more bloodshed in Moscow. Before a session of the RSDLP Central Committee on 1 November 1917 he joined in advocating the creation of a coalition government involving all of the socialist parties, claiming that a Bolshevik-only government could only be sustained through terror. 

Nogin was appointed People's Commissar for Commerce and Industry after the October Revolution but resigned on 17 November, along with Kamenev, Zinoviev, Rykov, Milyutin and others, - after he had presented a declaration repudiating "the preservation of power of a purely Bolshevik government by means of terror."

Nogin formally admitted his mistakes on 12 December (29 November Old Style) 1917, but at Lenin's insistence, his request to be re-admitted to the Central Committee was not granted until January 1918, when he was appointed Commissar for Labour for the Moscow Region. In March, he was permanently dropped from the Central Committee, but in April Nogin was appointed Deputy People's Commissar for Labour, where he enjoyed great authority in foreign trade and industry circles and accompanied Leonid Krasin to London for the negotiations over the Anglo-Soviet Trade Agreement.

In 1923, Nogin was appointed head of the Soviet textile trust. Unable to purchase raw cotton from the United States, Nogin travelled to New York in August 1923, and negotiated a deal with Anderson, Clayton & Co, one of the USA's largest cotton exporters, which was the first trade deal between a US company and the communist regime. While there, he helped the Coolidge administration communicate with Moscow using the code of the Soviet government, in an attempt to establish friendly relations between the two countries. He died soon after he had returned to Moscow.

Viktor Nogin is buried in Mass Grave No. 6 of the Kremlin Wall Necropolis in Red Square, Moscow.

Family 
He married Olga Pavlovna Ermakova, (1885–1977) with whom he had two children. His brother in law, Viktor Radus Zenkovich, was Chairmen of the Council of People's Commissars, Kyrgyz Autonomous Soviet Socialist Republic from 12 October 1920 to 1921.

Personality 
Arthur Ransome described Nogin as "an extremely capable, energetic Russian, so capable, indeed, that I found it hard to believe he could really be a Russian."

Positions held
Some of the Bolshevik party and government positions held by Viktor Nogin are listed below:
Executive Committee of the Moscow Soviet of Workers' Deputies (before 1917)
Central Committee member at the Sixth Congress of the RSDLP (July – August 1917)
People's Commissar for Trade and Industry in the first cabinet of the Council of People's Commissars at the Second All-Russia Congress of Soviets
Chairman of the Moscow Soviet of Workers' Deputies, succeeding Menshevik L.M. Khinchuk, who resigned (5 September 1917)
Head of Moscow as Chairman of the Presidium of the Executive Committee of the Moscow Soviet of Workers' Deputies (19 September 1917 – 13 November 1917)
Labor commissar of the Moscow Region and a deputy to the Constituent Assembly (17 November 1917)
Deputy People's Commissar of Labor of the Russian Soviet Federative Socialist Republic (April 1918)

Legacy
The town of Bogorodsk was renamed Noginsk in his honor in 1930. In 1934, the USSR Post Office produced a 15 Kopeck stamp honoring Viktor Nogin. A station in the Moscow Metro is Kitay-Gorod, originally called Ploshchad Nogina, after a square in central Moscow that once carried the name of Viktor Nogin (now Slavyanskaya Square). Streets named after Nogin still exist in St.Petersburg, Nizhniy Novgorod, Volgograd, Novosibirsk, Pavlovskiy Posad, Samara and Serpukhov.

See also
Rabocheye Znamya

References

1878 births
1924 deaths
Politicians from Moscow
People from Moskovsky Uyezd
Russian Social Democratic Labour Party members
Old Bolsheviks
People's commissars and ministers of the Soviet Union
Russian Constituent Assembly members
Central Executive Committee of the Soviet Union members
Chairpersons of the Executive Committee of Mossovet
Burials at the Kremlin Wall Necropolis